Energy Economics is a bimonthly peer-reviewed academic journal published by Elsevier covering the economic and econometric modelling and analysis of energy systems and issues (energy economics). The editor-in-chief is Richard Tol (University of Sussex). The Journal of Energy Finance & Development (1996-1999) was incorporated into Energy Economics in 1999.

Abstracting and indexing
The journal is abstracted and indexed in:
 Current Contents
 GEOBASE 
 Journal of Economic Literature
 Research Papers in Economics
 Social Sciences Citation Index
According to the Journal Citation Reports, the journal has a 2020 impact factor of 7.042.

See also
 The Energy Journal
 Resource and Energy Economics

References

External links

Economics journals
Elsevier academic journals
Energy and fuel journals
Energy economics
Publications established in 1979
Bimonthly journals
English-language journals